Salpichroa origanifolia is a species of flowering plant in the nightshade family known by the common names lily of the valley vine,  pampas lily-of-the-valley or cock's-eggs.

Distribution and habitat
This species is native to South America (Brasil, Bolivia, Peru, Argentina, Chile, Paraguay, Uruguay) and is naturalised in Africa (Algeria, Morocco, Tunisia), Australasia, Europe (United Kingdom, Italy, Spain, France, Portugal), and North America (United States, Mexico).

Description

This perennial, rhizomatous, decumbent to climbing, hairy vine has a trailing, highly branched, four-cornered zig-zagging stems. The calyx lobes reach . Corolla is bell-shaped or  urn-shaped, white or greenish. Anthers reach . Fruits can reach . They are ovoid berries, ill-smelling and  turn white or pale yellow when ripe.

Biology
This invasive vine commonly spreads via seeds and fragments of roots. Seeds germinate from early Spring to late Summer. Flowering occurs at any time but especially in Summer and bears fruits in Autumn.

Human culture
Lily of the valley vine is commonly grown as an ornamental plant in some countries. In others, it is considered an invasive weed . In Tasmania, it is regarded as a toxic weed and its sale and distribution are illegal.

Gallery

References

Solanoideae
Plants described in 1794
Taxa named by Henri Ernest Baillon
Taxa named by Jean-Baptiste Lamarck